Seetzenia is a genus of flowering plants belonging to the family Zygophyllaceae.

Its native range is the Sahara to north-eastern Tropical Africa (in Algeria, the Cape Provinces, Chad, Egypt, Libya, Mauritania, Niger, Somalia, Sudan and the Western Sahara), Arabian Peninsula (in Afghanistan, the Gulf States, Kuwait, Oman, Pakistan, Palestine, Saudi Arabia, and Yemen), the Sinai to India.

The genus name of Seetzenia is in honour of Ulrich Jasper Seetzen (1767–1811), a German explorer of Arabia and Palestine from Jever, German Frisia. 
It was first described and published in Narr. Travels Africa on page 231 in 1826.

Known species
According to Kew:
 Seetzenia lanata (Willd.) Bullock 
 Seetzenia orientalis Decne.

References

Zygophyllaceae
Rosid genera
Plants described in 1845
Flora of North Africa
Flora of West Tropical Africa
Flora of the Cape Provinces
Flora of Afghanistan
Flora of Sinai
Flora of the Arabian Peninsula
Flora of Pakistan
Flora of India (region)